The Swiss intelligence community is a group of agencies with responsibilities to protect the interests and infrastructure of Switzerland.

History 
The first federal military secret service was established in 1937-1939 as Büro Ha by Hans Hausamann a few years before the outbreak of the Second World War. Up to that point, intelligence gathering was left to the responsibility of the police.

Cold War Intelligence 
Not much is known about the Swiss intelligence agencies; however, case files from the Swiss Federal Police have been recently uncovered showing information regarding Swiss intelligence dealing with the People's Republic of China. During this time period of approximately 1960-1980 Switzerland's main goal regarding intelligence was the threat of communism within the country. What was found in the case files, and one way they would combat communism is through the system of fiches. Fiches was a system of index cards that tracked any sort of anti-patriotic actions performed by anyone in Switzerland. The system seemed to be successful with a recorded 900,000 cards made during the Cold War, and about 25,000 cards made for people of Chinese, Korean, and Vietnamese descent. The ultimate goal of fiches was to ward off any potential communist threats that might cause harm to Switzerland.

Federal Intelligence Service 
The new service was created by merging the Service for Analysis and Prevention (DAP) with the Strategic Intelligence Service (SND). Through the use of synergies and consistent adjustment to the needs of the service recipients a powerful intelligence service was created which is adapted to meet modern requirements and which forms the future contact for all levels of the Confederation and the cantons.

Partners and service recipients 
The partners and service recipients of the FIS are the political and military leaders, the federal administration,
in particular the departments:
 Federal Department of Defence, Civil Protection and Sport (DDPS)
 Federal Department of Justice and Police (FDJP)
 Federal Department of Foreign Affairs (FDFA)
 Federal Department of Economic Affairs (FDEA).
 Important partners are also the cantons, including 84 national security agents engaged by the Confederation.

Abroad the FIS maintains contacts to more than 100 intelligence, police and security services throughout the world. These bilateral and multilateral contacts have all been authorised by the Federal Council.

Organization 
The FIS's activities and mandate were defined by statute in the Federal Civil Intelligence Act 1997
 the FIS procures security policy relevant information about other countries and evaluates these
 the FIS fulfils intelligence tasks relating to domestic security according to the STA
 the FIS ensures a comprehensive assessment of the threat situation.

And according to the Federal Civil Intelligence Act
 the FIS recognises and combats dangers relating to terrorism, illegal intelligence, violent extremism and proliferation and
 identifies attacks against critical information infrastructure.

The thematic and geographic areas of interest are:
 In Switzerland these are terrorism and violent extremism, proliferation, attacks against critical infrastructure and illegal intelligence activities.
 Abroad, the FIS's thematic areas continue to be proliferation, terrorism, armed forces development, operational areas of our armed forces abroad as well as weapon technology and arms trade.
 The geographic areas of interest continue to be Europe, Russia and the CIS states, the Near East and north Africa, the Middle East, Asia, the US and hot spots in Africa.

Publications 

The Federal Intelligence Service produces an annual report called Switzerland's Security, available for download on the FIS website.

For instance, in September 2020, about the China–Switzerland relations, the report said that:

Budget
In 2017, the FIS' budget was CHF75.6 million.

Other Swiss intelligence agencies

Military Intelligence Service 

The Military Intelligence Service is the military intelligence branch of the Armed Forces.

Postal Service and Telecommunications Surveillance

International cooperation 
FIS has collaborated with over 100 foreign intelligence agencies. In 2017, the FIS received approximately 12,500 notifications from foreign intelligence agencies, and sent out 6,000.

Controversies

In 2012, a senior IT technician stole crucial intelligence documents.

See also
 Onyx (interception system)
 Secret files scandal

References

External links
 Official website
 Strategic Intelligence Service - Official publication 
  
 Post and Telecommunications Surveillance Service (PTSS) Homepage 

 
Intelligence agencies
Intelligence agencies
Intelligence agencies
Intelligence communities